Oskar Sverrisson (born 26 November 1992) is a footballer who plays for Varberg. Born in Sweden, Sverrison represents the  Iceland national football team.

Club career
On 9 December 2021, Sverrisson signed a three-year deal with Varberg.

International career
Sverisson was born in Sweden, and is of Icelandic descent through his father. Sverrisson received a call-up to the Icelandic national team in January 2020.  He made his international debut for Iceland on 19 January 2020 in a friendly match against El Salvador, which finished as a 1–0 win.

References

External links

1992 births
Living people
People from Hörby Municipality
Oskar Sverrisson
Oskar Sverrisson
Swedish footballers
Swedish people of Icelandic descent
Association football defenders
Lunds BK players
Dalkurd FF players
Landskrona BoIS players
Mjällby AIF players
BK Häcken players
Varbergs BoIS players
Allsvenskan players
Footballers from Skåne County